The Adidas Track Classic is an American track and field athletics meeting which has taken place annually in Carson, California since 2005. The meeting forms part of the USA Track & Field Visa Championship Series and is also one of the few area meetings where athletes can earn points to qualify for the World Athletics Final. The event has its roots in the Oregon Track Classic, which was sponsored by Adidas until 2005 and was forced to close that year due to lack of funding.

Top athletes from the North America, Central America and Caribbean (NACAC) area compete at the event and a number of national and area records have been set at previous editions. The event is usually held in mid-May at The Home Depot Center, part of the Adidas Performance Institute. Athletes who are part of the Adidas track team often feature prominently and World Champions and Olympic medalists often participate in the event. The competition is broadcast on television in the United States.

Previous editions
After winning the 100 metres at the 2004 edition, Olympic Gold Medalist Maurice Greene walked back to the finish line and took off his shoes as if they were on fire.  As part of the planned stunt Allen Johnson rushed onto the track with a real fire extinguisher to put out the shoes, in one of the more famous showboating incidents.

At the 2008 Adidas Track Classic Tyson Gay won both the 100 and 200 meters races, while Megan Metcalfe and Ethiopian Ali Abdosh set world leading times in the 3000 and 5000 meters respectively. Shannon Rowbury won the 1500 meters with the fastest time by an American woman in five years and Jeremy Wariner set the 400 meters meeting record.

In the 2009 edition Anna Willard ran the fastest 3000 meters steeplechase to have been run in the United States and Hazel Clark set a new track record in the 800 metres. LaShawn Merritt, Jenn Stuczynski aka Jenn Suhr, Aheza Kiros and Kerron Clement won their events with world-leading times but Clement's 400 meter hurdles world leading time was disqualified due to a misplaced hurdle. Second-placed Angelo Taylor struck out at the meet organisers for their mistake, saying he would never compete again at the event.

Meet records

Men's events
Records are correct as of May 17, 2009.

Women's events

References

External links

Sports competitions in Los Angeles
Track and field competitions in the United States
Annual track and field meetings
Sports competitions in Carson, California
Track and field in California